Mark Anthony Sullivan,  is a former senior Australian public servant and policymaker.

Background and early life
Sullivan studied economics and accounting at University of Sydney. Before graduating in 1973 the Australian Taxation Office offered him a cadetship, allowing him to finish his studies on pay.

Career
After graduating, Sullivan joined the Tax Office, working in offices in Sydney, Parramatta and Canberra. He went on to work in the Department of Social Security, SBS and the Department of Immigration, Local Government and Ethnic Affairs (later Immigration and Ethnic Affairs and then Immigration and Multicultural Affairs. In the immigration department, he was engaged in managing boat people arrivals in 1989 and 1990.

Between 1999 and 2002 Sullivan was the Chief Executive Officer of the Aboriginal and Torres Strait Islander Commission. Then, in 2002, 
Sullivan was appointed Secretary of the Department of Family and Community Services.

In 2004, the Howard Government rotated Sullivan from FaCS to the Department of Veterans' Affairs. In 2008 Sullivan left his role at Veterans' Affairs to join the ACTEW Corporation as managing director.

During his time at ACTEW, Sullivan led major water projects, including the Cotter Dam expansion project, with the aim to "drought-proof" Canberra. Sullivan announced his retirement from the ACTEW Corporation in February 2014, collecting a $690,000 termination payment on his departure.

Awards
In 2008 Sullivan was made an Officer of the Order of Australia for service as Secretary of FaCS.

References

References and further reading

Australian public servants
Living people
Year of birth missing (living people)
Officers of the Order of Australia
University of Sydney alumni
Secretaries of the Australian Government Veterans' Affairs Department